In mathematics, Turán's method provides lower bounds for exponential sums and complex power sums.  The method has been applied to problems in equidistribution.

The method  applies to sums of the form

where the b and z are complex numbers and ν runs over a range of integers.  There are two main results, depending on the size of the complex numbers z.

Turán's first theorem
The first result applies to sums sν where  for all n.  For any range of ν of length N, say ν = M + 1, ..., M + N, there is some ν with |sν| at least c(M, N)|s0| where

The sum here may be replaced by the weaker but simpler .

We may deduce the Fabry gap theorem from this result.

Turán's second theorem
The second result applies to sums sν where  for all n.  Assume that the z are ordered in decreasing absolute value and scaled so that |z1| = 1.  Then there is some ν with

See also
 Turán's theorem in graph theory

References
 

Exponentials
Analytic number theory